Arena Homme + is a fashion magazine for men published biannually since 1994. The first issue was published in Spring/Summer 1994. The founding editor-in-chief is Kathryn Flett. It is published by Ashley Heath and editor-in-chief is the stylist & former Dior Homme campaign model Max Pearmain. The current art director is Ben Kelway.

Arena Homme + came from the monthly Arena which itself was started out of The Face offices.  Arena Homme + is also the 'brother' magazine to the women's fashion biannual Pop.

References

External links
Newsstand Page, Latest Issue Details

Biannual magazines published in the United Kingdom
Men's magazines published in the United Kingdom
Lifestyle magazines published in the United Kingdom
Magazines published in London
Magazines established in 1994
Men's fashion magazines
Fashion magazines published in the United Kingdom